Gallants is located northeast of Stephenville, Newfoundland and Labrador, Canada. It was created as a Local Government Community on August 16, 1966.

Demographics 

See also
List of cities and towns in Newfoundland and Labrador

References

Towns in Newfoundland and Labrador